Oppam is a 2016 Indian Malayalam-language crime thriller film written and directed by Priyadarshan from a story by Govind Vijayan. It was produced by Antony Perumbavoor for Aashirvad Cinemas and starred Mohanlal and Samuthirakani. The film contains songs composed by the group 4 Musics, and the score was composed by Ron Ethan Yohann. N. K. Ekambaram was the cinematographer.

The plot follows Jayaraman (Mohanlal), a blind lift operator and caretaker in an apartment building. He is the loyal friend of Justice Krishnamoorthy (Nedumudi Venu), he cares for his schoolgirl daughter Nandini (Meenakshi). Krishnamoorthy gets murdered by a serial killer Vasudevan (Samuthirakani) who had a grudge with him. Jayaraman is framed for the crime, and must protect Nandini from Vasu and prove his innocence.

Regular collaborators Mohanlal and Priyadarshan were expected to work on a film in 2015, but it was postponed before principal photography began until the following year. Priyadarshan decided to make another film with Mohanlal, and began looking at screenplays. Both men wanted a break from their usual comedy films. Priyadarshan agreed on a short story by Govind Vijayan which was suggested by Mohanlal. The director developed a plot and screenplay, which was on its final draft in February 2016. The film began principal photography in March and ended in June; it was filmed in Kochi, Ooty, Vagamon, Thiruvananthapuram, and Idukki.

Oppam was released in India on 8 September 2016 and internationally on 21 September 2016 where it received generally positive reviews from critics, who praised Mohanlal's performance and the film's narrative style. The film performed really well at the box office earning above 52 crores  worldwide theatrical gross collection. It became the third-highest-grossing Malayalam film of all time and the second-highest-grossing Malayalam film of the year, behind Pulimurugan. At the Filmfare Awards South, the film was nominated in five categories (including Best Film, Best Director for Priyadarshan and Best Actor for Mohanlal) and won in the categories of Best Lyricist (for Madhu Vasudevan) and Best Male Playback Singer (for M. G. Sreekumar). It was dubbed and released in Telugu as Kanupapa on 3 February 2017, and in Hindi as Prime Witness. It was remade in Kannada in 2019 as Kavacha.

Plot 
Jayaraman was born blind, but has a heightened sense of smell, hearing and touch and is an expert in the martial art of kalaripayattu. Part of a large family, he works as a lift operator and caretaker in Kochi apartment building and is struggling to earn money for his sister's wedding. Jayaraman is loyal to Krishnamoorthy, a retired Supreme Court chief justice who lives in the building, and accompanies Krishnamoorthy unquestioningly on a long search for someone. On one trip, Krishnamoorthy tells Jayaraman the story behind his search. Years ago, a man named Vasudevan was imprisoned by Krishnamoorthy for a crime he did not commit; the judge followed the letter of the law, although he knew that Vasu was innocent. 

As a result, Vasu's family poisoned themselves. Vasu becomes an insane with grief, resolves to avenge his loss and tells Krishnamoorthy that he will kill him and his family. Vasu has been released from prison, and Krishnamoorthy feels threatened. Krishnamoorthy has a young daughter, Nandini, and is afraid that Vasu will kill her if he learns of her existence. To keep her safe, he sent her to a convent school and she knows nothing about him. Nandini's only link to her father is via Jayaraman, who frequently visits her at Krishnamoorthy's request. She asks Jayaraman about her father at each visit, and he replies that he will bring him the next time. Krishnamoorthy asks Jayaraman to help him transfer money from his bank account to another account he opened for Nandini. 

To reduce scrutiny, they avoid an electronic transfer. Jayaraman withdraws the money and gives it to Krishnamoorthy; the transaction is seen by Devayani, a divorcee and maid in the apartment building. Krishnamoorthy puts the money in a safe in his apartment. A large wedding takes place, to which everyone in the building is invited. Jayaraman goes to Krishnamoorthy's apartment after the party to find him dead and the money missing from the judge's safe. He senses the presence of someone else in the apartment; the killer tries to escape, but Jayaraman subdues him. After learning Jayaraman is blind, the killer who is revealed to be Vasu sneak past him and escapes in a car. In the chaos, Krishnamoorthy's money is missing and the police accuse Jayaraman of stealing it. 

They learn at the police station that Devayani's brother had the money, but Jayaraman is charged with murder. He vainly pleads for a chance to find the killer, whose presence he could sense. After Jayaraman is beaten by the police during an interrogation, he fights back and escapes. He tries to hide Nandini from Vasu with the aid of his officer friend Ganga. Jayaraman reveals to Ganga that Nandini is actually Vasu's daughter, whom the serial killer is trying to kill. He, Nandini and Ganga hide in the convent under the Mother Superior's supervision. However, Vasu arrives and attacks Ganga. Jayaraman tries to reveal that Nandini is Vasu's daughter, which she hears and becomes shocked. But Vasu believes that it as an emotional blackmail to save Nandini. Vasu tries all his way to kill Nandini but Jayaraman saves her. Jayaraman tells Nandini that she isn't actually Vasu's daughter and he told that to fool him. Suddenly when Vasu approaches Nandini, Jayaraman calls Vasu in his mobile phone. When the ringtone is heard, Jayaraman kills Vasu. In the end, Jayaraman and Nandini beginning a life together as a loving father and daughter.

Cast 

 Mohanlal as Jayaraman, blind caretaker and lift operator in an apartment building
 Samuthirakani as Vasudevan, a serial killer
 Nedumudi Venu as Krishnamoorthy, former Supreme Court Chief Justice
 Meenakshi as Nandini, Vasudevan's daughter and Jayaraman's foster daughter
 Anusree as ACP Ganga IPS
 Vimala Raman as Devayani, apartment maid
 Mamukkoya as Kunju "Kunjikka" Mohammad, security guard
 Renji Panicker as City Police Commissioner P. Padmakumar IPS
 Chemban Vinod Jose as CI Anandhan.R
 Innocent as Madhavan, Jayaraman's uncle
 Hareesh Kanaran as Veeran, security guard
 Kalabhavan Shajohn as Madhu, Police constable
 Kaviyoor Ponnamma as Jayaraman's aunt
 Kunchan as Narendran, Ganga's grand father
 Idavela Babu as Swaminathan, apartment resident
 Aju Varghese as "Maala" Babu, auto-driver
 Krishna Prasad as Raghavan, apartment resident
 Manikuttan as Devayani's brother
 Arjun Nandhakumar as Ravi, apartment resident
 Kalasala Babu as R. K. Menon, apartment resident
 Devshi Khanduri as Sardarji's daughter/Ravi's Fiancée
 Sona Heiden as Sardarji's wife
 Kozhikode Narayanan Nair as Pillai chettan, shopkeeper
 Sreelatha Namboothiri as Krishnamoorthy's sister
 Balaji Sharma as SI Sugunan 
 Chethan Jayalal as the janitor boy
 Anjali Nair as Lakshmi, Jayaraman's sister
 Bineesh Kodiyeri as Kannan, Jayaraman's brother
 Pradeep Chandran as ACP George IPS
 Sasi Kalinga as Varghese Mappila, money loaner
 Suchitra Pillai as Alphonsa, school principal
 Siddique as Bappootty, Jayaraman's friend (cameo appearance)
 Antony Perumbavoor as Boat passenger (cameo appearance)

Production

Development 
According to Priyadarshan, he was in a traumatic state after separating from his wife Lissy; he "couldn't think straight" and felt he had lost his "ability to make films". Mohanlal encouraged him to return to work, but "not with another comedy" (on which they had frequently collaborated). They were scheduled to work on an untitled, multilingual film in late 2015. The principal photography, expected to begin in September, was first postponed until March 2016 and never begun due to unfavourable weather in Russia (where the film was set). Priyadarshan decided to go ahead with a new project, and began reading screenplays; the director also had a two-month commitment from Mohanlal because of the other film.

He chose a script by November, and it was reported that filming would begin in January 2016; Mohanlal would join the set after finishing his commitment to Janatha Garage. In December, it was reported that filming would tentatively begin in February. In the same month, the film's title was announced; Priyadarshan would take over the screenplay, based on a story by Govind Vijayan. The film was reported to be a thriller, with Mohanlal playing a blind man falsely accused of murder. Priyadarshan described it as a "cat-and-mouse game" with a "little bit of humour too". Ooty and Kochi were scheduled as the primary filming locations.

Oppam was conceived as a crime thriller and developed from the gist of a short story by Vijayan. Mohanlal discovered the story and sent it to Priyadarshan. When the director pointed out several logical errors in the story, Mohanlal asked if he could rework it into a screenplay. Priyadarshan was intrigued by its premise of a blind man witnessing a murder. After spending a month working on it, Priyadarshan told Mohanlal that it can be made into a film and took two more months to draft a screenplay. According to the director, Oppam was the most challenging screenplay he had written to date. Priyadarshan said in January that filming would begin on 20 February, but in February he was still working on the screenplay's final draft and casting.

Although it was reported in December 2015 that G. P. Vijayakumar would produce Oppam for Seven Arts International, the film was produced by Antony Perumbavoor through his company, Aashirvad Cinemas. Director I. V. Sasi's son, Ani, was an associate director, and Priyadarshan's son Sidharth was an unofficial assistant director. In a later interview, in 2019, Priyadarshan said that Mohanlal had contemplated on directing Oppam (which would have been his directorial debut) but later he decided against it.

Casting 
Priyadarshan tailored the lead character, Jayaraman, for Mohanlal (his regular collaborator) when he wrote the screenplay. Tamil actor Samuthirakani was cast after Mohanlal in December 2015, with the rest of the cast and crew yet to be finalised. Vijay Menon dubbed for Samuthirakani's character. Even though Mohanlal has acted temporarily blinded characters, Oppam was the first film in which he played a blind character throughout the film. Mohanlal told Priyadarshan that he would not act like a stereotypical blind man (blinking and look up), but like a sighted person. They had visited a school for the blind in Chennai for pre-production research, and saw children playing and running between obstacles as if they could see. Priyadarshan had also known blind men whose other senses were keen. The character of Jayaraman has exceptionally sharp senses, and an expert in martial art of kalaripayattu.

In a January Deccan Chronicle article, Sanchita Shetty said that she liked the screenplay and would play a substantial role in her Malayalam film debut. The following month, Priyadarshan confirmed that Vimala Raman would play one of the film's two lead female roles; Shetty was on the shortlist for the other role. Vimala said that her role was Jayaraman's love interest, and the role is different from what she has done to date. Anusree was later cast in the other role, since Priyadarshan wanted an actress who "look[ed] very much a Malayali". She played Ganga, a newly appointed DSP whose grandfather is visually-impaired; she trusts Jayaraman, and helps him uncover the truth. Anusree was so looking forward to act in a Priyadarshan directorial that she did not ask about her role when he called.

In February, Baby Meenakshi was confirmed in a significant role with Mohanlal. Kalabhavan Shajohn confirmed his role that month as a villainous character. Sreeya Ramesh was confirmed in an unidentified role in April, and Sasi Kalinga in June. Mamukkoya played comic security guard Kunjikka, who was unable to get names right, mistakenly substituting them with Islamic names. Aju Varghese had a brief role as an auto rickshaw driver in scenes with Mohanlal and Samuthirakani. Varghese, a fan of Priyadarshan's films, requested a role in Oppam. Devshi Khanduri made her Malayalam debut as a Punjabi girl in love with a Malayali boy (Arjun Nandhakumar). Priyadarshan described the film to Nandhakumar during preparations for the 2016 Celebrity Cricket League.

Innocent played Jayaraman's uncle, and Anjali Nair his sister. Producer Antony Perumbavoor made a cameo appearance. Chemban Vinod Jose, Hareesh Kanaran, Renji Panicker, Kunchan, Kalasala Babu, Idavela Babu, Sona Heiden, Kaviyoor Ponnamma, and Siddique also had supporting roles. In a December 2016 interview, Dharmajan Bolgatty said that he was offered a role in the film but could not commit due to scheduling conflicts.

Filming 
Oppam began principal photography on 5 March 2016 in Kochi, Kerala. Mohanlal joined the set that day, and Vimala a week later. A large set was constructed for a North Indian wedding with a song sequence with Mohanlal and Vimala and dancers in Punjabi dress. The elaborately-produced song was completed in five days, and the dance was choreographed by Kala. Filming took place for three weeks at locations in Thammanam, Thrippunithura, and on Marine Drive in Kochi. The first shooting schedule was finished by the end of March. The film's cinematographer was N. K. Ekambaram.

The crew resumed filming in Kochi and in and around Ernakulam district in May 2016. Some scenes were shot at Fort Kochi, and tharavad scenes were filmed in Chottanikkara. Additional filming was done in Pullikkanam and Kanjar in Idukki district, where Mohanlal joined the set for a 10-day shooting schedule. Filming was done at Vagamon during the second week of May. Oppam fight scenes were coordinated by Stunt Silva.

Filming moved to Ooty in Tamil Nadu in the first week of June. Priyadarshan considers Ooty a lucky charm, since it was a location for some of his successful films. He recreated a frame from the 1986 film, Thalavattam, (his first film in Ooty) in the song "Minungum Minnaminuge". Using the same camera lens used in Thalavattam, it was filmed in School Manth (where the song "Ponveene", from Thalavattam, was shot). Mohanlal and Meenakshi appeared in the frame which featured Mohanlal and Lissy in the original.

After Ooty, there was a two-day schedule at Chitranjali Studio in Thiruvananthapuram on 13 and 14 June for scenes with Mohanlal and Samuthirakani which were reportedly the film's climax. After the Thiruvananthapuram schedule, filming wrapped at the studio on the evening of 14 June 2016. Vimala said in an interview that directors usually take extra master shots, suggestion shots and counter shots while filming, but Priyadarshan had edited scenes in mind and did not make extra shots of any scenes. Oppam reportedly cost 7 crore.

Post-production 
Post-production began as soon as the filming ended, and progressed in June and July 2016 at Priyadarshan's Four Frames studio in Chennai. Oppam was edited by M. S. Ayyappan Nair, and the crew returned to Chithranjali Studio in early July for dubbing. Composer Ron Ethan Yohann began working on the score after editing was completed by the end of July, first spotting the film. The post-production progressed through August 2016. Priyadarshan said that he reluctantly cut some of Mamukkoya's comedy scenes to reduce Oppam length. Its final cut censored by the Central Board of Film Certification was 157 minutes long.

Music 

The film's six-song soundtrack was composed by 4 Musics (a group consisting of Jim Jacob, Biby Matthew, Eldhose Alias, and Justin James). The soundtrack album was released on the Satyam Audios label on 17 August 2016. Composer Ron Ethan Yohann made his Malayalam-film debut with the score, and composed the theme music based on character descriptions.

4 Musics began work in December 2015. The songs were recorded, mixed, and mastered at Jacob's Noise Headquarters in Kochi. The songs were well-received and a breakthrough for 4 Musics. Alias and James were abroad while composing, and the team worked on the music via WhatsApp and Skype. Producer Antony Perumbavoor suggested 4 Musics, who had only one film credit (Just Married), to Priyadarshan; the director gave them three situations and one week to return with three options for each. "Chinnamma Adi" was sung by M. G. Sreekumar, who also sang "Minungum Minnaminuge" with Sreya Jayadeep. "Pala Naallayi" was sung by a ten-voice ensemble. "Chirimukilum" was not included in the film; it was a tribute to composer S. P. Venkatesh, who had collaborated with Priyadarshan on some of his successful soundtracks, and was written in Venkatesh's style.

"Chinnamma Adi" was written by Madhu Vasudevan. Priyadarshan wanted its first line to begin with a name, and "Chinnamma" was added. For the second verse, Mohanlal insisted on "Kukkumma" (the pet name of actress Sukumari, as a tribute to her). "Minungum Minnaminuge" was written by B. K. Harinarayanan when his mother was in hospital, and his thoughts about how she cared for him were reflected in the song. Its lyrics were written after the melody was composed, and the song's position in the film was described by Priyadarshan. Sharon Joseph was recommended to 4 Musics by composer Mejo Joseph for writing the Hindi lyrics for "Pala Naallayi". Sharon Joseph sings and records her compositions, and when 4 Musics heard her Hindi recording she was invited to sing the original as well.

Track listing 

In a soundtrack review, The Times of India Deepa Soman wrote that "the songs have tried to mix in all elements a listener is looking for  emotion, celebration and class". "Chinnamma Adi" is a "playful-yet-classical song" and "also has a few dollops of western classical music thrown in, and is a fun listen". "Pala Naallayi" is "a celebration song with a lot of percussion and joyful chorus". "Chirimukilum" is a "free-flowing song filled with melancholy ... though it can't boast of great emotional allure or range, the lyrics can touch you by its simple, poignant philosophy". "Minungum Minnaminuge", "probably the best of the lot", "tenderly expresses the sweet relationship between a father and daughter".

Srivatsan said for India Today, "Oppam has some extraordinary tracks ... though the song 'Chinnamma Adi' makes you tap your foot, it is 'Minungum Minnaminuge' that becomes an instant addiction". Padmakumar K. of Malayala Manorama wrote about "Chinnamma Adi", "The rhythm, milieu and the camera work complemented the whole mood of the song ... 4 Musics successfully fused melody with a blend of folk and the classical styles". Anu James of the International Business Times wrote, "The party song, 'Pala Naalayi', is colourful, with good choreography and visuals". Athira M. of The Hindu said about "Chinnamma Adi", "It has a classical touch, but with a foot-tapping beat". "Chinnamma Adi" and "Minungum Minnaminuge" were included in The Hindu list of the most-successful Malayalam songs of 2016. Of the year's most-viewed Malayalam video songs in YouTube, "Minungum Minnaminuge" placed second and "Chinnamma Adi" sixth.

Release 
Oppam theatrical release was announced along with its first poster in March 2016, scheduled for the festival of Onam in September. At his request, a special showing was arranged for the actor Rajinikanth at his Chennai home a day before the film's general release. Oppam was released in India on 8 September 2016 by Maxlab Cinemas and Entertainments on 104 screens across Kerala, and the film opened internationally on 21 September. In Europe, it was scheduled for a limited release on 14 September by PJ Entertainments and a general release on 23 September. The release was postponed until 21 September due to a censorship issue, and advance booking began on 19 September. The film was released on 119 screens in the United Kingdom and Ireland on 23 September, the widest release there for a Malayalam film.

In November 2016, Priyadarshan said that the film would be dubbed and released in Telugu and Tamil and Mohanlal would dub his voice in both. Its Telugu dubbing rights were purchased by Overseas Network Entertainment. Entitled Kanupapa, the Telugu version was released worldwide on 3 February 2017. Oppam was released for home video on 22 December 2016 by Satyam Audios. The film premiered on 9 April 2017 on the Asianet television channel. According to Broadcast Audience Research Council data, it was in fourth place among premiere films of all time with the most target rating points on Malayalam channels (3,949,000 impressions) as of September 2017.

Marketing 
In May 2016, Mohanlal and Priyadarshan produced and released a Dubsmash video to encourage entries in its video contest. Priyadarshan asked director Alphonse Puthren to edit the film's trailer. The trailer debuted in Kerala theatres on 22 July with the Tamil film, Kabali, which was distributed by Maxlab Cinemas and Entertainments in the state. "Minungum Minnaminunges music video, with Mohanlal and Meenakshi, was released on 24 August on YouTube. Oppam was promoted on "Thiruvonam Lalettanodu Oppam", a September program which was part of a photography contest organised by Mathrubhumi, 94.3 Club FM and the electronic retailer Bismi, and Mohanlal met with the winners.

Reception

Box office 
The film grossed 1.56 crore on its opening day at the Kerala box office, topping parallel releases Oozham and Iru Mugan. The film received positive word of mouth, which boosted ticket sales. Box-office earnings increased exponentially over the next few days; the film grossed 7.25 crore through its four-day opening weekend (2.03 crore that Sunday), with a distributor's share of 3.45 crore. It exceeded the first-week earnings of Premam by grossing 12.6 crore with a share of 6 crore, setting an opening-week record in the Kerala state.

Oppam was the fastest film to earn 20 crore in Kerala (11 days). By grossing over 25 crore on day 17 it became the highest-grossing film of the year at the Kerala box office, passing Jacobinte Swargarajyam. Within 22 days it crossed the 30 crore mark, the fastest film to do so in Kerala. The film's worldwide total was 35 crore at 31 days, with 22.75 crore from Kerala. The film grossed 42 crore worldwide, Oppam was the second-highest-grossing Malayalam film of the year (behind Pulimurugan), with box-office earnings of over 30 crore in Kerala box office. The film ran for over 125 days in Kerala theatres,

Oppam grossed 8.31 crore overseas in Gulf Cooperation Council territories in 10 days. The film grossed £45,371 in its opening weekend (23  25 September) from 74 British theatres, the fourth-best foreign opener that weekend. It grossed £84,185 in four weekends from the United Kingdom and Ireland regions. In the United States, it earned US$44,790 in the opening weekend (30 September  2 October) from 16 screens, and US$94,466 in four weekends.

Critical reception 
Oppam received generally positive responses from critics. G. Ragesh of Malayala Manorama gave Oppam three-and-a-half out of five stars, he said it is a carefully crafted and well-made thriller with some "edge-of-the-seat moments". Ragesh found Mohanlal's portrayal of Jayaraman the best part of the film (which "celebrates the natural actor that Mohanlal is"), and praised the "perfectly choreographed" action scenes. A Sify critic called it an engaging film and wrote: "Oppam is based on a script which is fine at best. But it is the slick presentation and of course, a brilliant performance from Mohanlal that overcomes its minor weaknesses" and adding, "It is the stellar performance from Mohanlal that adds to the merits of this thriller in a crucial way". The critic gave Samuthirakani a special mention.

The Indian Express Goutham V. S. gave Oppam three out of five stars, and opined that the film is engaging and have an interesting plot that brings back the vintage Mohanlal-Priyadarshan combo. "Watching Mohanlal as Jayaraman, one is reminded of the skill set this actor possesses. He seamlessly becomes his character and so smooth is the transition that you forget the effort that must have gone into it". He praised the cinematography and score that "maintain a tensed mood as the intriguing hide-and-seek between the protagonist and antagonist plays out". Also giving the film three out of five stars, Deepa Soman of The Times of India wrote: "Oppam has a few elements to create some entertainingly 'tensed' moments through its length, but it's not one of those gripping thrillers that leave you content when you leave the hall". Soman enjoyed the songs that she felt suit the situations well, and are engaging.

For Rediff.com, Paresh C. Palicha wrote: "It's an interesting film with the basics of the typical Priyadarshan films remaining in place ... the biggest positive about Oppam is that Mohanlal gives more sharpness and detailing to the writing and direction with his extraordinary performance and that makes the film a must watch". He gave it 2.5 out of five stars. Srivatsan of India Today wrote, "Oppam, on many levels, is solid at its core. Unlike many commercial entertainers, the film is formulaic ... what's intriguing is the director's treatment of the subject". He praised Mohanlal's performance and the film's score and songs, giving it two-and-a-half out of five stars.

Anu James of the International Business Times called Oppam "a winner all the way": "The movie offers some edge-of-the-seat moments with an engaging narrative. Even though the culprit is revealed in the first half of the thriller, the movie doesn't let you get bored" and said the direction and screenplay are impressive. She praised Mohanlal's performance and the songs, cinematography, and editing and added that even with a predictable plot and few questions that might leave the audience confused, "the many positive aspects of the movie make the negatives fade away". For The News Minute, Sowmya Rajendran wrote: "Mohanlal nails the role of a blind man in this well-executed thriller" and also noted the performances of the rest of the cast. Although the film "keeps you interested till the end, the plot somewhat loses steam in the second half".

Awards 
Oppam received six nominations at the 64th Filmfare Awards South and won two awards for the song "Chinnamma Adi"—Sreekumar won the award for playback singing, and Vasudhevan for lyrics. The film received six nominations at the 6th South Indian International Movie Awards, but did not win in any category. Menon who dubbed for Samuthirakani's voice won an award for dubbing at the 47th Kerala State Film Awards. Oppam was not eligible for the 64th National Film Awards, since Priyadarshan chaired the year's award jury.

Remake 
In June 2016, two months before Oppam release, Priyadarshan told Press Trust of India that he was interested in making a Bollywood version, saying "there are already inquiries for Tamil and Telugu remakes. I am just waiting for it to release and see how it is received by the audience". After the film's release, he said that he planned to show it to Shah Rukh Khan and Aamir Khan; he would not direct any South Indian-languages versions, but "a lot of offers have come for remake rights and negotiations are still going on". Overseas Network Entertainment bought the remake and dubbing rights for Telugu, with Nagarjuna approached to play the lead. In November, Priyadarshan confirmed that a Kannada remake would star Shiva Rajkumar. The following month, he said that Ajay Devgn, Saif Ali Khan, and John Abraham had seen the film but the cast for the Hindi remake was not finalised. The director said that he made cultural changes in the story to appeal to Bollywood audiences, primarily in the film's first half. Devgn was virtually confirmed in February 2017, and the film would be produced by Viacom 18 Motion Pictures. The Kannada remake, Kavacha, began filming in November 2017 with Meenakshi reprising her role, and was released on 5 April 2019.

References

External links 
 
 

2010s Malayalam-language films
2010s serial killer films
2016 crime thriller films
2016 films
Fictional portrayals of the Kerala Police
Films about blind people in India
Films about murder
Indian films about revenge
Films about stalking
Films based on short fiction
Films directed by Priyadarshan
Films shot in Kochi
Films shot in Ooty
Films shot in Thiruvananthapuram
Indian crime thriller films
Indian serial killer films
Malayalam films remade in other languages
Torture in films
Aashirvad Cinemas films